The 1927–28 season was Blackpool F.C.'s 27th season (24th consecutive) in the Football League. They competed in the 22-team Division Two, then the second tier of English football, finishing nineteenth.

Sydney Beaumont became the club's new manager prior to the start of the season, succeeding Major Frank Buckley.

Jimmy Hampson was the club's top scorer, with 31 goals, including four goals against Nottingham Forest at Bloomfield Road on 24 March 1928, Blackpool winning 5–3. He also scored two hat-tricks: one at Wolves on 26 November 1927, and one at home to Fulham on 5 May 1928, the final day of the season. Two other players also scored hat-tricks during the season: Tommy Browell, in a 6–2 victory over Bristol City at Bloomfield Road, and Bert Fishwick, in a 3–1 victory at home to Reading.

A milestone occurred on Christmas Eve, when Blackpool played their 1,000th Football League game, at Fulham.

Season synopsis
It took until the seventh game (after a run of five consecutive defeats) for Blackpool to chalk up their first victory, a 6–2 scoreline at home to Bristol City. Tommy Browell scored a hat-trick, while Albert Watson, Sidney Tufnell and Horace Williams netted one each.

They were victorious in only three further games before Christmas, at which point they had accrued just thirteen points.

1928 saw a slight improvement, with eight victories, which kept them just clear of relegation.

Their FA Cup campaign started and ended at the Third Round stage with a 4–1 home defeat by Oldham Athletic.

Squad
Len Crompton
Percy Thorpe
Arthur Tilford
Albert Watson
George Ayres
Billy Benton
Jack Meredith
Tommy Browell
Billy Tremelling
Mark Crook
Percy Downes
Ted Malpas
Fred Mobbs
John Grimwood
William Cowan
Horace Williams
Syd Tuffnell
Jimmy Hampson
Laurie Barnett
Dick Neal
Reg Wright
William Grant
Syd Brookes
Bert Fishwick
Bobby Hughes
Johnny McIntyre
Arthur Purdy
Jack Oxberry
Stan Ramsay

Table

Transfers

In

Out

Notes

References

Blackpool F.C.
Blackpool F.C. seasons